Qaleh Ji (also Romanized as Qal‘eh Jī; also known as Qal‘eh Jeh, Qal‘eh Ju, and Qal‘eh Jū) is a village in Kusalan Rural District, in the Central District of Sarvabad County, Kurdistan Province, Iran. At the 2006 census, its population was 1,633, in 393 families. The village is populated by Kurds.

References 

Towns and villages in Sarvabad County
Kurdish settlements in Kurdistan Province